Simón Pablo Elissetche Correa (born 28 September 1977) is a Chilean football manager.

Elissetche also worked as head coach of the Timor Leste national football team from October 2017 until December 2017. Runner-up in the CTFA International Tournament in Taiwan.

Coaching career

PSSB Bireuen 
In March 2012, Simon sign a contract with PSSB Bireuen for the Premier Division season 2011–12.

Persita Tangerang 
On 9 June 2013, he agreed to a contract with Persita Tangerang. After managing the team for six matches with record of 3 wins, 1 draw and 2 losses, he resigned.

Persikutim East Kutai 
After resigning from Persita, he agreed to manage Liga Indonesia First Division club Persikutim East Kutai.

Assalam F.C. 
Since February 2016 he managed at Assalam F.C. at Second Division Liga Futebol Amadora Timor Leste. He is the first foreign coach managed in Assalam F.C. and also the first generation in Timor Leste football history because on 2016 is the first time for Timor Leste to start the football league after independence from Indonesia on 2002. In Assalam F.C. he success to bring Assalam F.C become Runner Up group B Liga Futebol Amadora Timor Leste but not enough for him to bring Assalam F.C. to First Division Liga Futebol Amadora Timor Leste. He will start new season next month in July 2016.

He successfully brought Assalam into the finals in the 2016 Taça 12 de Novembro before they lost to the champions AS Ponta Leste.

Karketu Dili 
Ellissetche coached Karketu Dili in the 2017 season and he won the 2017 Liga Futebol Amadora with them that year. In the squad, he had three foreign players, including his compatriot Antonio Vega.

Timor Leste 
Ellissetche officially started his job as head coach of the national team in October 2017.

Aceh United 
Ellissetche returned to Indonesia when he accepted the job as new head coach of Liga 2 side Aceh United F.C. for the 2018 season. His services were terminated by mutual consent on 19 October 2018.

Lalenok United 
In 2020, he successfully brought Lalenok United to the 2020 FFTL Copa champion trophy. In the final match which took place at the Estadio Municipal Cafe, Dili, Tuesday (27/10/2020), Lalenok defeated Sport Laulara e Benfica with a score of 2-1.

This success earned Lalenok a ticket to represent Timor Leste to compete in the 2021 AFC Cup. The 2020 Copa FFTL is a substitute for the Amadora Futebol League (League 1) Timor Leste which was not held, following the COVID-19 pandemic.

PSPS Riau 
In 2021 he accepted an offer to become the head coach of PSPS Riau which plays in Liga 2 Indonesia.

References

External links

 Simón Elissetche Interview

1977 births
Living people
Sportspeople from Santiago
Chilean football managers
Chilean expatriate football managers
Persita Tangerang managers
Timor-Leste national football team managers
Indonesia Super League managers
Chilean expatriate sportspeople in Indonesia
Chilean expatriate sportspeople in East Timor
Expatriate football managers in Indonesia
Expatriate football managers in East Timor
Association footballers not categorized by position